The Hellenic Terror is the third album from French death metal band Kronos. Released in Europe on April 1, 2007. The album leaked on March 30, 2007.

Track listing
All songs written by Kronos
"The Road of Salvation" (3:52)
"Bringers of Disorder" (4:01)
"...Until the End of Time" (4:06)
"Suffocate the Ignorant" (3:30)
"A Huge Cataclysm" (4:11)
"Tricephalic Hellkeeper" (3:27)
"Petrifying Beauty, part.1 Divine Vengeance" (3:16)
"Petrifying Beauty, part.2 The Murderous Reflection" (3:23)
"Ouranian Cyclops" (4:29)
"Maze of Oblivion" (4:17)

Credits
 Grams (guitar)
 Richard (guitar)
 Tom (bass and backup vocals)
 Mike (drums)
 Kristof (vocals)

2007 albums
Kronos (band) albums